Crambus leuconotus is a moth in the family Crambidae. It was described by Philipp Christoph Zeller in 1881. It is found in Colombia.

References

Crambini
Moths described in 1881
Moths of South America